The Candowie Reservoir is located South-East of Melbourne, in the locality of Almurta. The Candowie Reservoir is the only reservoir within Westernport Water's operations.

Candowie Reservoir was constructed in 1963 with an initial capacity of 1037ML. Upgrade works in 1978 increased the capacity to 1761ML, and again in 1982 to 2263ML. Large scale upgrade works carried out in 2013 further increased storage capacity to 4463ML.

Tennent Creek is the main supply for the Candowie Reservoir, with additional pumped supply from Bass River, a pipe connection to Cardinia Reservoir, and boreholes in Corinella

References 

Reservoirs in Victoria (Australia)